Ioan Veliciu (born 25 August 1985) is a Romanian weightlifter. He competed in the men's featherweight event at the 2004 Summer Olympics.

References

1985 births
Living people
Romanian male weightlifters
Olympic weightlifters of Romania
Weightlifters at the 2004 Summer Olympics
Sportspeople from Arad, Romania
21st-century Romanian people